Civil War Fantasy is an album by Altamont, which was released in 1998 through Man's Ruin Records.

Track listing
"Civil War Fantasy" (Altamont) – 2:57
"Ezy Rider" (Jimi Hendrix) – 4:38
"Bitch Slap" (Altamont) – 4:19
"Whips" (Altamont) – 4:49
"My One Sin" (Altamont) – 2:33
"Makers Mark" (Altamont) – 2:50
"Black Tooth Powder" (Altamont) – 3:57
"Up River" (Altamont) – 4:56
"Downwind" (Altamont) – 3:30
"Smoke" (Altamont) – 6:34

Personnel
Dale Crover - Guitar, vocals
Joey Osbourne - drums, vocals
Dan Southwick - Bass
Billy Anderson - Organ, vocals, Engineer, Producer
George Horn - Mastering

References

Altamont (band) albums
1998 albums
Man's Ruin Records albums
Albums produced by Billy Anderson (producer)